Stephen Phelps Oakley, FBA (born 20 November 1958) is a British classicist and academic. An expert on the work of Livy, he is the ninth Kennedy Professor of Latin at the University of Cambridge and a Fellow of Emmanuel College.

Career
Oakley was educated at Bradfield College in Berkshire. He went on to study at Queens' College, Cambridge, where he graduated with a Bachelor of Arts (BA) degree in 1980 and a Doctor of Philosophy (PhD) degree in 1985.

From 1984, he worked at the university's Emmanuel College, first as a research fellow and, from 1986, as an official fellow. In 1998, he accepted a position at the University of Reading which he held until 2007. He then returned to Cambridge to succeed Michael Reeve as the Kennedy Professor of Latin.

Bibliography 

 The hill-forts of the Samnites (Archaeological Monographs of the British School at Rome, 10), British School at Rome, London, 1995.
 A Commentary on Livy: Books VI–X, Volume I, Introduction and Book VI, Oxford University Press, 1997.
 A Commentary on Livy: Books VI–X, Volume II, Books VI-VIII, Oxford University Press, 1998.
 A Commentary on Livy: Books VI–X, Volume III, Book IX, Oxford University Press, 2005.
 A Commentary on Livy: Books VI–X, Volume IV, Book X, Oxford University Press, 2005.

References

Members of the University of Cambridge faculty of classics
British Latinists
Fellows of Emmanuel College, Cambridge
Fellows of the British Academy
Living people
1958 births
Kennedy Professors of Latin